Kyrre is a common Norwegian given name. The name comes from the Old Norse word kyrr, which translates to "calm, peaceful". It is believed to have been derived from Olaf III of Norway, who was nicknamed "Olaf Kyrre" (Olaf the Peaceful).

People named Kyrre 
As first name
 , Norwegian author
 , Norwegian actor and translator
 , Norwegian lawyer
 , Norwegian musician
 Kyrre Grepp, Norwegian politician
 Kyrre Gørvell-Dahll, Norwegian DJ, known by stage name Kygo
 , Norwegian actor
 , Norwegian host
 Kyrre Lekve, Norwegian biologist
 , Norwegian politician
 Kyrre Nakkim, Norwegian journalist
 , Norwegian actor
 , Norwegian author and humorist
As second name
 Kristen Kyrre Bremer, Norwegian theologian and bishop

See also

Karre

Norwegian masculine given names